Lake Kavadi is a lake of Estonia.

See also
List of lakes of Estonia

Kavadi
Rõuge Parish
Kavadi